Richard Arthur Smith (May 17, 1939 – February 19, 2012) was an American professional baseball player who appeared in 76 games as an outfielder, first baseman and pinch hitter in Major League Baseball for the New York Mets and Los Angeles Dodgers over parts of three seasons spanning 1963–1965. He attended Oregon State University.

Smith began his pro career in the Dodger farm system in 1957, and after six minor-league seasons his contract was purchased by the Mets on October 11, 1962. In , he was recalled from Triple-A Buffalo in July and batted .238 with ten hits through the end of the season. He collected another 21 hits as Met, batting .223, before returning to Buffalo. After that season, on October 15, the Mets traded him back the Dodgers in exchange for pitcher Larry Miller. He made the eventual  World Series champion Dodgers out of training camp and went hitless in six early-season at bats before being sent back to Triple-A when rosters were cut from 28 to 25 men. It proved to be his last trial in MLB. He retired in 1968 after 12 years in professional baseball. 

Smith batted .218 during his MLB career; his 31 hits included six doubles and two triples.  He was credited with seven runs batted in. He hit 120 home runs as a minor-leaguer.

References

External links

Baseball Almanac – Major League Baseball Players Who Died in 2012

1939 births
2012 deaths
Baseball players from Oregon
Buffalo Bisons (minor league) players
Denver Bears players
Great Falls Electrics players
Green Bay Dodgers players
Greenville Spinners players
Los Angeles Dodgers players
Major League Baseball first basemen
Major League Baseball outfielders
Minor league baseball managers
New York Mets players
Odessa Dodgers players
Omaha Dodgers players
People from Lebanon, Oregon
Reno Silver Sox players
Savannah Senators players
Spokane Indians players
Thomasville Dodgers players